Larry Byrd (born August 1, 1948) is an American politician. He is a member of the Mississippi House of Representatives from the 104th District, being first elected in 2007. He is a member of the Republican Party. He served in the US Army's 82nd Airborne Division.

References

1948 births
Living people
Republican Party members of the Mississippi House of Representatives
21st-century American politicians